Geoffrey Robert James Borwick, 5th Baron Borwick (born 7 March 1955), is a British businessman, hereditary peer and member of the House of Lords.

Early life
Jamie Borwick was born on 7 March 1955. He was educated at Sandroyd School and Eton College.

Career
Borwick became Chief Executive (from 1987 to 2001) of Manganese Bronze Holdings plc, best known for making London Taxis, and then Chairman until 2003.

Borwick was founder and owner of electric truck producer Modec in Coventry in 2004. The company entered administration in March 2011 with debts of over £40m. He was Chairman of Route2Mobility Ltd, funding wheelchairs and scooters for disabled people as part of the UK's Motability scheme, until October 2010. He was also a Deputy Chairman of the board of British Low Carbon Vehicle Partnership.

His other business appointments include as Chairman of Countryside Properties (Bicester) Ltd, and Chairman of Federated Trust Corporation Ltd. He was a non-executive Director of Hansa Trust plc from 1984 until 2012.

On 16 July 2013, Lord Borwick was elected to sit in the House of Lords at a hereditary peers by-election in replacement of the late Lord Reay; he sits on the Conservative benches.

Philanthropy
Borwick is a Trustee of the Royal Brompton and Harefield Hospitals Charity, having retired from the British Lung Foundation after 2 terms of 6 years as Trustee.

Personal life
Borwick married Victoria Poore in 1981, who is a former Conservative London Assembly Member and Deputy Mayor of London, and, from 2015 to 2017, MP for Kensington; they have three sons and a daughter. One of their sons is Thomas Borwick, a digital media strategist for the Conservative Party and the Vote Leave campaign.

Arms

References

External links
Interview with Jamie, Lord Borwick at Financial Times
Interview with Jamie, Lord Borwick at REAL BUSINESS
The Lady Borwick MP at UK Parliament website

1955 births
Living people
People educated at Sandroyd School
People educated at Eton College
British founders of automobile manufacturers
5
Conservative Party (UK) hereditary peers
Hereditary peers elected under the House of Lords Act 1999